Diana Maximovna Shnaider (born 2 April 2004) is a Russian tennis player.

She is a member of the North Carolina State women's tennis team.

Junior career
She won the girls' doubles titles at the 2021 Wimbledon Championships, partnering Belarusian Kristina Dmitruk, and the 2022 Australian Open, partnering with American Clervie Ngounoue.

On the ITF Junior Circuit, Shnaider has a career-high combined ranking of No. 3, achieved on 13 December 2021.

Junior Grand Slam results - Singles:
 Australian Open: QF (2022)
 French Open: SF (2021)
 Wimbledon: 1R (2019, 2021)
 US Open: SF (2022)

Junior Grand Slam results - Doubles:
 Australian Open: W (2022)
 French Open: F (2020)
 Wimbledon: W (2021)
 US Open: W (2022)

Career
Shnaider made her Grand Slam debut at the 2023 Australian Open after qualifying into the main draw. She defeated Kristína Kučová, who was using a protected ranking for her first major win, before losing in the second round to No. 6 seed Maria Sakkari. As a result, she reached the top 100, at world No. 94, on 30 January 2023.

Performance timeline

Singles

WTA Challenger finals

Singles: 1 (1 title)

ITF finals

Singles: 5 (4 titles, 1 runner-up)

Doubles: 4 (3 titles, 1 runner-up)

Junior Grand Slam finals

Doubles: 4 (3 titles, 1 runner-up)

References

External links
 
 
 Diana Shnaider profile on NC State Wolfpack

2004 births
Living people
Russian female tennis players
Grand Slam (tennis) champions in girls' doubles
Wimbledon junior champions
Australian Open (tennis) junior champions
NC State Wolfpack women's tennis players